Tapasa vai Ganga (Ganga was brought to the earth only by Tapa ie penance meaning which a great task can only be achieved by Tapa or Penance) is the biography of Radha Krishna Choudhary, a historian and writer of Mithila, written by Binod Bihari Verma, published in 1995.

Overview 
This biography, contains two parts in the same volume. The first part deals with the sequence of life of Prof Radha Krishna Choudhary, and the second part deals with the analysis of his thinking, creative and academic works.

Contents 
 Aamukh (Foreword)
 Aabhaar gyaapan (Acknowledgements)
 Part I: Jeevan dhara (Life story)
 Biyar mul evam purvaj (Genealogy and forefathers)
 Pitamah (Grandfather)
 Mata pita (Parents)
 Vishvak sthiti (Global situation)
 Tatkaalin bhartiya rajniti (Indian political situation)
 Janma (Birth)
 Mithila mata sa agaadh prem (Love of mother mithila)
 Baalsangi koshik vinaash leela (Destruction caused by Kosi river)
 Balyakaal (Childhood)
 Vidyarthi jeevan (Student life)
 Bhagalpur ma college (College study in Bhagalpur)
 Tatkaalin vampanthi andolan (Contemporary leftist movement)
 Rashtraprem o svatantrata snagram (Patriotism and freedom struggle)
 1942 ke nau din (Nine days of 1942)
 1943: Bangaalak akal piditak seva (Service to the drought hit Bengal in 1943)
 Uttar bihar rilif kameti (North bihar relief committee)
 Anya sabha samitik ayojan (Organisation of other conferences and meetings)
 Lekchararak pad par niyukti (Appointment as Lecturer)
 Bivah (Marriage)
 Kumharaarak utkhanan (Archaeological excavation at Kumhar)
 Shikshakak rup ma (As an educationist)
 Chhatrak sansmaran (In the memory of his students)
 Parivar (Family)
 Mitra varg (Friends)
 Devghar baas (Stay at Deoghar)
 Antim samay (Last stage)
 Sanstha aur vyaktitva sa sampark (Contact with various people and institutes)
 Vibhinn sanstha dvara samman aur pratishtha (Awards by various institutes)
 Itihaas sambandhi maulik shodh (Original research in history)
 Maithili sahitya ke Radha Krishna Choudharik yogdaan (Contribution of Radha Krishna Choudhary to Maithili Literature)
 Maithili lekhan (Maithili writings)
 Upsanhaar (Afterword)
 Part II: Chintan dhaara (Thinking)
 Rachna dhaara: krititva (Creative writing)
 Krititva charcha (Discussion of creative writing)
 Sarantidha (Sarantidha)
 Dhammapada (Dhammapada)
 Maithili sahityak sarvekshan (Survey of Maithili literature)
 Vidyapati kaalin mithila (Mithila in the times of Vidyapati)
 Mahakavi lal das (Mahakavi Lal Das)
 Parishisht (Appendices)
 Biyar moolak vanshavriksha (Genealogical chart of Biyar mool)
 Pratham mathili lekhak sammelan ma itihaas vibhagak sabhapatik bhashan (Declamation at first Maithili writers conference as the chairperson of history department)
 Srimati shanti devik sansmaran (Srimati Shanti Devi remembers)

See also 
 Radha Krishna Choudhary
 Binod Bihari Verma
 Panjis

External links 
 Tapasa vai Ganga

Books on Mithila Region
Maithili-language books
1995 non-fiction books
Culture of Bihar
Culture of Mithila
People from Bihar
Indian biographies